Gyokko-ryū (玉虎流) is a school of Japanese martial arts that specialises in kosshijutsu (骨指術), shitōjutsu (指頭術) and ninjutsu (忍法). Gyokko-ryū was founded by Tozawa Hakuunsai Hogen (戸沢白雲斎, 1156-1159) in the Heian period (794–1192). The sōke title is claimed to be passed down to Tetsuji Ishizuka from Masaaki Hatsumi (1931-) who in turn received it from Toshitsugu Takamatsu (1889-1972).

References

Ko-ryū bujutsu